Great Sandy Island is an island between Onslow and Dampier, off the Pilbara coast of Western Australia.

References

Islands of the Pilbara